Ivan Aleksandrovich Selemenev (born 24 December 1996) is a Russian professional footballer who plays as a left winger for FC Tekstilshchik Ivanovo on loan from FC Rodina Moscow.

Career
He made his debut in the Russian Professional Football League for FC Dynamo Stavropol on 5 October 2015 in a game against FC Astrakhan. For Dinamo he played until 2017.

After Dinamo, Selemenev played for FC Afips Afipsky in 2017, but while at Afips, he was loaned out to FC Chernomorets Novorossiysk.

After his loan ended, he left Afips and signed with Chernomorets in July 2018.

On 24 June 2019, Selemenev signed with Dunav Ruse.

Career statistics

References

External links
 
 Profile by Russian Professional Football League

1996 births
Sportspeople from Stavropol
Living people
Russian footballers
Association football midfielders
FC Dynamo Stavropol players
FC Chernomorets Novorossiysk players
FC Dunav Ruse players
FC Tekstilshchik Ivanovo players
Russian Second League players
First Professional Football League (Bulgaria) players
Russian expatriate footballers
Expatriate footballers in Bulgaria
Russian expatriate sportspeople in Bulgaria